In the entertainment industry, a summer hit is a song that is released and peaks in its popularity during summer. In some years, a single pop song will gain widespread international popularity during the summer season, becoming that summer's definitive summer hit in many countries. Many of the best-known summer hits emerge from outside the British and American pop music industries.

The equivalent of summer hit in France is the tube de l'été (summer tube), an expression that exists since 1960s which became more commercially used by the late 1990s.

Examples

In the US 
 1958: "Nel Blu Dipinto Di Blu (Volare)" – Domenico Modugno
 2019: "Old Town Road" by Lil Nas X and Billy Ray Cyrus; "Señorita" by Shawn Mendes and Camila Cabello

Worldwide 
 1989: "Lambada" by Kaoma
 2019: "Bad Guy" by Billie Eilish (Russia); "Con Altura" by Rosalía, J Balvin and El Guincho (Hispanic countries)

See also 
Song of the summer

References 

Summer
Popular music
Popular culture
Musical terminology
Song forms
Recorded music